Hu Yamei (27 April 1923 – 3 October 2019) was a Chinese physician and medical researcher. She served as President of Beijing Children's Hospital, and co-founded Beijing Hu Yamei Children's Medical Research Institute (BHI). She was an academician of the Chinese Academy of Engineering. A specialist in the treatment of pediatric leukemia, she cured more than 700 children.

Biography
Hu was born into a wealthy businessman's family on April 27, 1923. In 1941 she was accepted to Yenching University, and transferred to Peking University in March of the following year. In 1946, she joined the underground organization of the Communist Party of China (CPC). Shortly after joining the Communist Party, she came to practice at the Beijing Private Children's Hospital. Hu has pioneered research on childhood leukemia in China since 1976., when she was 53 years old. In 1981, Hu became president of Beijing Children's Hospital, a affiliated hospital of the Capital Normal University. Hu was elected an academician of the Chinese Academy of Engineering (CAE) in 1994. In 2011, Hu founded the Beijing Hu Yamei Children's Medical Research Institute (BHI) with academician Zhang Jinzhe. On August 6, 2009, the then Premier Wen Jiabao visited her in Beijing. Hu died of illness in Beijing, aged 96.

Hu was a delegate to the 7th, 8th, 9th and 10th National People's Congress. He was also a delegate to the 12th and 13th National Congress of the Communist Party of China.

Awards
 Title of March 8th Red Banner
 May 1st Labor Medal

References

External links
 Biography of Hu Yamei on Wiley Online Library

1923 births
2019 deaths
Scientists from Beijing
Yenching University alumni
National University of Peking alumni
Members of the Chinese Academy of Engineering
Chinese women physicians
Chinese paediatricians
Chinese medical researchers
Physicians from Beijing